Sunday Night Football may refer to:

 NBC Sunday Night Football, the Sunday night broadcast of American NFL games by NBC since 2006
 ESPN Sunday Night Football, the Sunday night broadcast of American NFL games from 1987 to 2005 by ESPN
 NFL on TNT, the Sunday night broadcast of American NFL games from 1990 to 1997 by TNT
 Sunday Night Football radio coverage on Westwood One
 Sunday Night Football (Australian TV program), an Australian football sports broadcast television program that aired on the Seven Network from 1991 to 2000 and again in 2014

See also
 European Football Show, sometimes referred to as Sunday Night European Football
 Monday Night Football
 Thursday Night Football